Nikolai Isaakovitch Utin (French: Nicolas Outine; 8 August 1841 – 1 December 1883) was a Russian socialist and revolutionary. He spent most of his adult life in Switzerland, where he participated in the founding of the Russian section of the International Workingmen's Association. In the conflict between Mikhail Bakunin and Karl Marx, he supported Marx, and through his involvement with Geneva journals Narodnoye delo and l'Égalité as a writer and editor, he played an important role in increasing support for Marx at Bakunin's expense.

Career 
Nikolai Utin was born 8 August 1841 in Kherson in the Russian Empire (now Ukraine). His father, a Russian merchant, was a Jewish convert to Russian Orthodoxy.

Utin and his siblings were involved in the student movement of the 1860s in Saint Petersburg. When the government placed restrictions on students in 1861 in an attempt to control the spread of nihilist radicalism in universities, Nikolai encouraged fellow students towards political aims. His speeches, along with the manifestos and leaflets circulated by a group that became known as "Utin's party", contributed to the street protests of 26 and 27 September, at which both Nikolai and his younger brother Yevgeny were arrested, along with nearly 300 other protesters. Nikolai's brother Boris was a professor of the university at the time, and resigned over the university's failure to enact democratizing reforms. 

Nikolai Utin was released from the Peter and Paul Fortress after a month of incarceration, and shortly thereafter became a leading member of Land and Liberty. He fled Russia for London in May 1863. He arrived in Vevey, Switzerland in 1864, and was condemned to death in absentia.

While in London, he had attempted to persuade Nikolai Ogaryov and Aleksandr Herzen, the editors of the influential journal Kolokol (The Bell), to turn over the newspaper to the next generation of Russian revolutionaries, with himself in control. They refused. At a "unity conference" that Utin helped to organize in Geneva over the New Year in 1864/5, the ideological divide between the two generations having grown even further, Utin successfully convinced the others of his age group to endorse his claim to Kolokol and his demand that the previous editors step aside.

When anarchist Mikhail Bakunin founded the monthly journal Narodnoye delo (The People's Cause) with funding from Zoya Obolenskaya in Geneva in 1868, he initially made Utin a co-editor with Nikolai Zhukovsky, but ultimately did not allow him to take part in creating the first issue. Utin, who did not believe that Bakunin's anarchism would appeal to a Russian audience, took control of the journal with the backing of several fellow emigres, including Olga Levashova, Zhukovsky's sister-in-law. Elisabeth Dmitrieff, a co-editor of the journal, used her inheritance to fund the newspaper. Utin ran the journal from 1868 to 1870.

Well known in the expat Russian revolutionary community, he participated in the foundation of the Russian section of the International Workingmen's Association (IWA) with Elisabeth Dmitrieff. The Geneva group that founded this section, following Johann Philip Becker's suggestions, wrote to Karl Marx for support and strongly distanced themselves from Bakunin.

Utin wrote the "Nouvelles Etrangères" section for l'Égalité, the French-language IWA newspaper based in Geneva, and eventually became editor-in-chief. When he turned away from Bakunin and towards the positions of Marx, he used his influence at this newspaper and Narodnoye delo to keep the revolutionary community in Geneva sympathetic to Marx and not Bakunin.

On 17 April 1871, he wrote to Marx about his doubts regarding the Paris Commune, a movement that he ultimately did not join. However, he remained sympathetic to Elisabeth Dmitrieff, who had returned to Russia after the events of the Paris Commune, and so he was warned by Yekaterina Barteneva and her husband Victor Bartenev when Dmitrieff's partner, and later husband, Ivan Davydovski, had been arrested for murder and was in need of his help. On 17 December 1876, he wrote to Karl Marx, who found a lawyer to accept the case pro bono.

After the split of the IWA, Utin withdrew from politics. He returned to Russia in 1878 and died on 1 December 1883 in Saint Petersburg.

Personal life 
In 1863, Nikolai Utin married  (1841 - after 1913), daughter of architect  and writer . She was among the first women to attend Saint Petersburg University and was arrested in 1861 during the student unrest. She followed him into exile in 1863 and returned with him in 1878. She wrote for Vestnik Evropy, under her own name or as N. I. Tal. Her 1885 novel Zhizn za zhizn (Жизнь за жизнь, "Life for Life") caused a scandal.

Utin's siblings were also involved in the student movement of the 1860s. Boris Isaakovitch Utin (1832–1872) was a professor at Saint Petersburg University. Yakov Isaakovitch Utin (1839-1916) was a businessman and privy counsellor. Yevgeny Isaakovitch Utin (1843–1894) was a lawyer and journalist, a regular contributor to Vestnik Evropy. Their sister, Liuba, married Mikhail Stasyulevich, an academic who would become the founder and chief editor of Vestnik Evropy and had been one of Nikolai Utin's teachers, in April 1859.

Further reading

References 

Members of the International Workingmen's Association
1841 births
1883 deaths
Articles with missing Wikidata information
Russian Marxist journalists
Russian socialists
Russian expatriates in Switzerland
Print journalists
Russian revolutionaries
Prisoners of the Peter and Paul Fortress
Burials at Novodevichy Cemetery (Saint Petersburg)